The 2012 Louisiana–Monroe Warhawks football team represented the University of Louisiana at Monroe in the 2012 NCAA Division I FBS football season. The Warhawks were led by third-year head coach Todd Berry and played their home games at Malone Stadium. They were a member of the Sun Belt Conference. They finished the season 8–5, 6–2 in Sun Belt play to finish in a three-way tie for second place. They were invited to the Independence Bowl, the first bowl appearance in school history, where they were defeated by Ohio.

Schedule

Schedule Source:

 Denotes the largest crowd in Malone Stadium history.

Game summaries

@ Arkansas

The Warhawks came into War Memorial Stadium as 30.5 point underdogs.  In regulation, the Warhawks played the Razorbacks to a tie. Arkansas, who had three starters (including QB Tyler Wilson) injured in the game, was held to a field goal in the 1st overtime. ULM faced a 4th and 1 in same overtime period, and elected to pursue a first down. The result was a ULM QB Kolton Browning game-winning touchdown run. Browning finished with 481 total yards, three touchdowns passing, and one touchdown rushing.

Louisiana-Monroe's victory over #8 Arkansas marked the first victory by any Sun Belt Conference team over a top-ten opponent and the first victory over any ranked opponent since 2004.

@ Auburn

Baylor

@ Tulane

@ Middle Tennessee

Florida Atlantic

@ WKU

South Alabama

Louisiana–Lafayette

@ Arkansas State

North Texas

@ FIU

Ohio–Independence Bowl

Rankings

References

Louisiana-Monroe
Louisiana–Monroe Warhawks football seasons
Louisiana-Monroe Warhawks football